Phil Hassan (born 18 August 1974) is a former rugby league and rugby union footballer who played in the 1990s and 2000s.

Leeds career
Hassan joined Leeds in August 1993, making his début in his first season. Hassan joined from Wigan-based amateur club St Pat's. Hassan played against his home town club in the crushing Premiership Trophy Final of 1995. Hassan was a regular in the Leeds first team squad over the next three seasons but his big break through came at the start of Super League when he made 24 appearances and scored four tries. Hassan established himself in the Leeds first team and kicked on the following season, missing only one game and scoring 11 tries, including a spectacular long range try in both games against Salford that season. In total, Hassan played 71 times for Leeds scoring 16 tries, however the arrival of Brad Godden meant there was no place for Hassan at Headingley.

Rugby career
Hassan moved on from Leeds at the end of the 1997 season, switching codes to play rugby union with Worcester (RU). Hassan returned to rugby league with Salford before joining Halifax in 2000. At the end of the 2001 season, Hassan was released by the Halifax, and again switched codes to join Fylde (RU), in April 2002 again returned to rugby league joining Wakefield Trinity, and later Swinton.

References

External links
(archived by web.archive.org) Profile at leedsrugby

1974 births
Living people
Fylde Rugby Club players
Halifax R.L.F.C. players
Leeds Rhinos players
Rugby league centres
Rugby league players from Wigan
Rugby league wingers
Salford Red Devils players
Swinton Lions players
Wakefield Trinity players
Worcester Warriors players